The frigate Shtandart was the first ship of Russia's Baltic fleet. Her keel was laid on April 24, 1703, at the Olonetsky shipyard near Olonets by the decree of Tsar Peter I and orders issued by commander Aleksandr Menshikov. The vessel was built by the Dutch shipwright Vybe Gerens under the direct supervision of the tsar. She was the first flagship of the Imperial Russian Navy and was in service until 1727. The name Shtandart was also given to the royal yachts of the tsars until the Russian Revolution in 1917. Tsar Nicholas II's royal yacht was last of this series.

The replica frigate has three masts and her displacement is 220 tons. The original crew complement in 1703 was between 120 and 150, and the modern crew consists of 30 trainees and 10 officers.

The first Shtandart (1703) 
The name Shtandart signifies Peter the Great's desire to gain access to the Baltic Sea, which at the time of the Shtandart's construction was dominated by the Swedish Empire. A plan to take control of the Baltic Sea away from Sweden was revived after Peter's Grand Embassy ended in 1698. The name refers more directly to a naval ensign created for the new Baltic Fleet, of which the Shtandart was the first ship. Peter's goal was finally realized after he decisively defeated Swedish forces at the Battle of Poltava in 1709, a turning point for Russia in the Great Northern War (1700–1721).

The Shtandart's design combined techniques from English and Dutch shipbuilding schools. The frame of the ship is wide, almost square, and the ship's double bottom is flat, reducing the draft. The high rigging of the sails is in the English style. The frigate was launched on August 22, 1703, and set sail on September 8, 1703, for St. Petersburg.

The Shtandart and Peter I 
The Shtandart was built in only five months, and Tsar Peter I's personal involvement may have expedited the construction. Peter had learned shipbuilding techniques from the Dutch during his Grand Embassy tour of western Europe (1697–98), and he sailed on the Shtandart as its captain under the pseudonym Peter Mihajlov on its maiden voyage from Olonets to Saint Petersburg in September 1703. In the great cabin there is a compass hanging over a table which can only be read from its underside. A Russian legend relates that this compass hung over Peter's hammock and that when he woke up, he always checked the compass to ensure that the frigate was on course.

Repairs and breakup 
The Shtandart was overhauled in 1710 and four cannons were added to her armament, making her a 28-gun frigate. The ship was laid up in drydock in 1711 to have several beams replaced. In 1727 Catherine I ordered a survey of the frigate to determine if she was sound enough for another refit. During an attempt to raise the ship above the waterline, the hull was cut in half by cables used in the process. The Shtandart was broken up, and Catherine ordered a replacement to be built. This order was finally carried out in 1994.

The modern replica (1999) 

In 1994 a small group of sailing enthusiasts led by Vladimir Martus started construction of a replica of the ship. 
Martus developed a new layout of the Shtandart wherein she was built with four bulkheads, dividing her into five compartments. 
The "Shtandart Project" (a non-commercial organisation dedicated to youth development) launched a replica of the frigate on September 4, 1999.

References

External links 

   Official Shtandart website (Russian)
   Official Shtandart website (English)

Baltic Fleet
1700s ships